Vouillé may refer to the following places in France:

 Vouillé, Deux-Sèvres, a commune in the Deux-Sèvres department
 Vouillé, Vienne, a commune in the Vienne department
 Vouillé-les-Marais, a commune in the Vendée department

See also 
 Battle of Vouillé